Kaleköy is a village in the Antalya province, Turkey, over the ruins of ancient Sinema.

Kaleköy can also refer to:
 Kaleköy, Amasya, Amasya Province, Turkey
 Kaleköy, Gökçeada
 Kaleköy, Ilgaz
 Kaleköy, Kurucaşile, Bartin Province, Turkey
 Kaleköy, Çobanlar, Afyonkarahisar Province, Turkey